Xu Xiaoxiao  (born 24 December 1992) is a Chinese snowboarder.
 
She competed in the 2011, 2013 and 2017 FIS Snowboard World Championships, and in the 2018 Winter Olympics, in parallel giant slalom.

References

External links

1992 births
Living people
Chinese female snowboarders
Olympic snowboarders of China
Snowboarders at the 2018 Winter Olympics
Snowboarders at the 2017 Asian Winter Games
21st-century Chinese women